Yasmina Rinarovna Kadyrova (born 11 December 2004) is a Russian pair skater. With her former partner, Ivan Balchenko, she is the 2021 Rostelecom Cup bronze medalist.

Personal life 
Kadyrova was born on 11 December 2004 in Kazan, Russia. Her mother, Rezeda Sibgatullina, is a figure skating coach and director of Kazan's junior figure skating program. She has a younger sister, Riana, who is also a skater. Kadyrova and her family are Volga Tatars and identify as Muslim.

Career

Early years 
Kadyrova began learning to skate in 2008, coached first by her mother in Kazan. She trained in Kazan as a single skater until the 2016–17 season when she moved to St. Petersburg to train under Alexei Mishin and his wife, Tatiana. Kadyrova skated under Mishin for two seasons, only competing domestically, before being accepted into Eteri Tutberidze's camp in Moscow. She trained under Tutberidze for a portion of the 2018–19 season, during which time she was captured on video training a quadruple salchow; however, she was forced to leave the group due to injury and returned to her native Kazan to recover. Later in the season, she competed at her only international assignment as a single skater, the 2019 Children of Asia International Sports Games, where she finished fourth.

Kadyrova teamed up with her first partner, Ivan Balchenko, in September 2019. She'd admired pair skating since her time training under Alexei Mishin and was inspired to try the discipline after skating in an Art on Ice show in Switzerland with 2018 Olympic champion Aljona Savchenko. She relocated to Perm to skate with Balchenko under his coaches, Pavel Sliusarenko and Valentina Tiukova. Due to the six-year age gap between Kadyrova and Balchenko, the team was forced to begin their career as seniors, despite Kadyrova's lack of pairs experience. Kadyrova/Balchenko competed domestically in the Russian Cup series during the 2019–20 season and took silver at the Cup Final.

2020–21 season 
Kadyrova/Balchenko opened their season at the 2020 Russian test skates, an unscored event that allows the Russian Figure Skating Federation to evaluate the programs and condition of their national team members. They next competed at the second stage of the domestic Russian Cup series, the qualifying competition series to the national championships, in Moscow, where they finished second in a field of two behind Daria Pavliuchenko / Denis Khodykin. At their second Russian Cup assignment, the fourth stage in Kazan, they finished just off the podium in fourth place and, with a combined total of 28 points, qualified to nationals.

Although the team was not initially slated to compete at the event, Kadyrova/Balchenko were assigned to the 2020 Rostelecom Cup after Pavliuchenko/Khodykin withdrew due to illness in November. At the competition, Kadyrova/Balchenko placed fourth in both the short program and the free skate to place fourth overall, just behind training-mates Apollinariia Panfilova / Dmitry Rylov.

At the 2021 Russian Championships, their first nationals as a team, Kadyrova/Balchenko, cleanly skated their short program to place sixth in the segment amidst a strong field of competitors. The team fell to seventh in the free skate after struggling with their throw jumps but maintained their standing of sixth overall.

Kadyrova/Balchenko concluded their season at the end of February at the 2021 Russian Cup Final. They placed second in the short due to an uncharacteristic mistake from Daria Pavliuchenko / Denis Khodykin but were overtaken in the free skate and finished third in that segment and third overall.

On 25 May 2021, it was announced that Kadyrova/Balchenko had parted ways with coaches Pavel Sliusarenko and Valentina Tiukova to move to the camp of Tamara Moskvina and Artur Minchuk in St. Petersburg. It was reported that Kadyrova's mother, Rezeda Sibgatullina, brokered the move.

2021–22 season 
Kadyrova/Balchenko opened their international competitive season at the 2021 CS Denis Ten Memorial Challenge in October, where they won the bronze medal. At their next event and first ISU-sanctioned competition, the 2021 CS Warsaw Cup, Kadyrova/Balchenko placed third in both the short program and the free skate with personal best scores to win the bronze medal overall.

Having earned the Russian host pick in the pairs field at the 2021 Rostelecom Cup, Kadyrova/Balchenko made their ISU-sanctioned Grand Prix debut in November. At Rostelecom, the team again placed third in both segments of competition to earn the bronze medal.

Kadyrova/Balchenko finished ninth at the 2022 Russian Championships.

On April 18, it was announced that Kadyrova and Balchenko had split and that Kadryova was now paired with Valerii Kolesov.

Programs

With Kolesov

With Balchenko

As a single skater

Competitive highlights 
GP: Grand Prix; CS: Challenger Series

With Kolesov

With Balchenko

As a single skater

Detailed results 

With Kolesov

With Balchenko

As a single skater

References

External links 

 

 2004 births
 Russian female pair skaters
 Living people
 Sportspeople from Kazan
 Volga Tatar people
 Tatar sportspeople